is a Japanese ice sledge hockey player and para powerlifter. He was part of the Japanese sledge hockey team that won a silver medal at the 2010 Winter Paralympics.

In his third year at university, he lost the functioning of both legs following an accident involving high-voltage electric wires.

References

External links 
 
 

1971 births
Living people
Japanese sledge hockey players
Paralympic sledge hockey players of Japan
Paralympic silver medalists for Japan
Ice sledge hockey players at the 2006 Winter Paralympics
Ice sledge hockey players at the 2010 Winter Paralympics
Medalists at the 2010 Winter Paralympics
Komazawa University alumni
Sportspeople from Nagano Prefecture
Paralympic medalists in sledge hockey